Yadegar-e Sofla (also Romanized as Yādegār-e Soflá; also known as Yādegār-e ‘Alī Khvājeh-ye Soflá and Yādegār-e Pā’īn) is a village in Zam Rural District, Pain Jam District, Torbat-e Jam County, Razavi Khorasan Province, Iran. At the 2006 census, its population was 806, in 172 families.

References 

Populated places in Torbat-e Jam County